The International Guitar Competition & Festival, Berlin, is a competition for classical guitarists from all over the world. The art director is the composer and guitarist Dang Ngoc Long.

The participants cannot be more than 32 years old and have to play required pieces and freely chosen pieces from memory.

The competition has occurred every two years since 2006, always in the capital of Germany. To date, there have been participants from many countries, including Austria, Belgium, Chile, China, Colombia, Denmark, Ireland, Italy, New Zealand, Peru, Poland, Russia, Spain, the United Kingdom, Vietnam, Belarus, Ukraine, Brazil, South Korea, France...

Winners 

2006
1. Prize:  Shiri Coneh (Israel)
2. Prize:  Noriyuki Masuda (Japan)
3. Prize:  Karoline Kumst (Germany)
3. Prize:  Gaku Yamada (Japan)

2008
1. Prize:  Ekachai Jearakul (Thailand)
2. Prize:  Mateus Dela Ponte (Brazil)
3. Prize:  Nohyoung Lee (South Korea)

2010
1. Prize:  Chia-wei lin (Taiwan)
2. Prize:  Bilodid Denys (Ukraine)
3. Prize:  Claire Sananikone (France)

2012:
1. Prize:  Claire Sananikone (France)
2. Prize:  Igor Dedusenko (Belarus)
3. Prize:  Nejc Kuhar (Slovenia)
Special Prize:  Svetoslav Kostov (Bulgaria) (Best presentation of compositions from Dang Ngoc Long)

2014:
1. Prize:  Jakob Bangsø (Denmark)
2. Prize:  Yaroslav Makarich (Belarus)
3. Prize:  Dimitry Zagumennikov  (Russia)

2016:
1. Prize:  Niklas Johansen (Denmark)
2. Prize:  An Tran (Vietnam)
3. Prize:  Francesco Scelzo (Peru)
Special Prize:  Yaroslav Makarich (Belarus)  (Best presentation of compositions from Dang Ngoc Long)

2020:
1. Prize:  Yaroslav Makarich (Belarus)
2. Prize:  Chinnawat Themkumkwun (Thailand)
3. Prize:  Luca Romanelli (Italy)
Special Prize:  Nhu Khanh Dao (Vietnam)  (Best presentation of compositions from Dang Ngoc Long)

Jury 

Past members of the international jury include (Dang Ngoc Long), (Inge Wilczok), (Daniel Wolff), Daniel Göritz, Lubomir Dshokow, Jürgen Buch, Karin Leo, Thomas Bruns, Shiri Coneh, Uta Schlegel, Emil Petrov, (Ekachai Jearakul), Chia-wei lin, Claire Sananikone and Jakob Bangsø

References

External links
Gitarrenverein Berlin-Germany
International Guitar Competition Berlin (Deutsches Musikinformationszentrum)
Берлин 2014
International guitar Competition in Germany
Vietnamese contestant wins special prize at the international guitar competition
Video Bangso - 1st prize International Guitar Competition Berlin 2014
Video Chia Wei-Lin - 1st prize International Guitar Competition Berlin 2010

Music competitions in Germany